Franck Dumoulin (born May 13, 1973 in Denain) is a pistol shooter from Bordeaux, France.

Palmarès

Olympic Games

World Championships 
 1994 World Championships (Milan, Italia) :
 Gold Medal in 10 m Air Pistol
 Bronze Medal in 50 m Pistol
 1998 World Championships (Barcelona, Spain) :
 Gold Medal in 50 m Pistol
 2002 World Championships (Lahti, Finland) :
 Bronze Medal in 10 m Air Pistol

European Championships (since 2001) 
 2002 European Championships (Thessalonique, Greece) :
  Silver medal in 10 m Air Pistol
 2005 European Championships (Tallinn, Estonia) :
  Bronze medal in 10 m Air Pistol (Walter Lapeyre, Franck Dumoulin, Manuel Alexandre-Augrand)
 2006 European Championships (Moscow, Russia) :
  Gold team medal in 10 m Air Pistol
 2007 European Championships (Deauville, France) :
  Silver team medal in 10 m Air Pistol (Walter Lapeyre, Franck Dumoulin, Manuel Alexandre-Augrand)
 2007 European Championships (Grenada, Spain) :
 Gold Medal in 25 m Standard Pistol
 2011 European Championships (Brescia, Italy) :
 Gold Medal in 10 m Air Pistol

World Cups (since 2001) 
 5 victories in 10 m Air Pistol
 1 victory in ISSF World Cup Finals in 10 m Air Pistol (2001 Munich)
 2 victories in 50 m Pistol
 2008 World Cup (Beijing, China) :
 Gold Medal in 10 m Air Pistol

Personal bests 
 10 meters air pistol : 591/600 (1998, France record)
 50 meters free pistol: 577/600 (1998, France record)

External links
 French Shooting Federation WebSite

References 

1973 births
Living people
People from Denain
French male sport shooters
ISSF pistol shooters
Olympic shooters of France
Shooters at the 1992 Summer Olympics
Shooters at the 1996 Summer Olympics
Shooters at the 2000 Summer Olympics
Shooters at the 2004 Summer Olympics
Shooters at the 2008 Summer Olympics
Shooters at the 2012 Summer Olympics
Olympic gold medalists for France
Olympic medalists in shooting
Medalists at the 2000 Summer Olympics
Sportspeople from Nord (French department)
20th-century French people
21st-century French people